Saurabh Bandekar (born 16 November 1987), is an Indian cricketer who played for Goa. He played in 64 first-class, 43 List A and 33 Twenty20 matches from 2004 to 2017.

References

External links
 

1987 births
Living people
Indian cricketers
Goa cricketers
Cricketers from Mumbai